German submarine U-633 was a Type VIIC U-boat built for Nazi Germany's Kriegsmarine for service during World War II.
She was laid down on 22 September 1941 by Blohm & Voss, Hamburg as yard number 609, launched on 10 June 1942 and commissioned on 30 July 1942 under Oberleutnant zur See Bernhard Müller.

Design
German Type VIIC submarines were preceded by the shorter Type VIIB submarines. U-633 had a displacement of  when at the surface and  while submerged. She had two shafts and two  propellers.

U-633 was fitted with five  torpedo tubes (four fitted at the bow and one at the stern), fourteen torpedoes, one  SK C/35 naval gun, 220 rounds, and one twin  C/30 anti-aircraft gun. The boat had a complement of between forty-four and sixty.

Service history
The boat's career began with training at 5th U-boat Flotilla on 30 July 1942, followed by active service on 1 March 1943 as part of the 9th Flotilla for the remainder of her short service.

Fate
U-633 was sunk on 8 March 1943 in the North Atlantic south-west of Iceland, in position , by depth charges from the US Coast Guard cutter USCGC Spencer. 43 dead (all hands lost).

Wolfpacks
U-633 took part in two wolfpacks, namely:
 Neuland (4 – 6 March 1943)
 Ostmark (6 – 8 March 1943)

Summary of raiding history

See also
 Convoy SC 121

References

Bibliography

External links

German Type VIIC submarines
1942 ships
U-boats commissioned in 1942
Ships lost with all hands
U-boats sunk in 1943
U-boats sunk in collisions
U-boats sunk by British merchant ship
World War II shipwrecks in the Atlantic Ocean
World War II submarines of Germany
Ships built in Hamburg
Maritime incidents in March 1943